This is a list of the National Register of Historic Places listings in Woodbury County, Iowa.

This is intended to be a complete list of the properties and districts on the National Register of Historic Places in Woodbury County, Iowa, United States. Latitude and longitude coordinates are provided for many National Register properties and districts; these locations may be seen together in a map.

There are 58 properties and districts listed on the National Register in the county, including three National Historic Landmarks. An additional four properties were once listed, but have since been removed.

|}

Former listings

|}

See also

 List of National Historic Landmarks in Iowa
 National Register of Historic Places listings in Iowa
 Listings in neighboring counties: Cherokee, Dakota (NE), Ida, Monona, Plymouth, Thurston (NE), Union (SD)

References

Woodbury
 
Buildings and structures in Woodbury County, Iowa